Otakar Kubín (22 October 1883 – 17 October 1969) was a Czech painter and sculptor.

Biography
Kubín was born in Boskovice, Moravia, Austria-Hungary. His works are mainly associated with Impressionism. He was influenced by such artists as Vincent van Gogh and Paul Gauguin, and formed a friendship with Pablo Picasso. He was known in France as Othon Coubine. He died in Marseille, France, in 1969.

External links
 
 Radio Prague  – extensive biography
 

1883 births
1969 deaths
20th-century Czech painters
Czech male painters
Czechoslovak emigrants to France
People from Boskovice
20th-century Czech male artists